Camponotus sericeiventris, the shimmering golden sugar ant, is a species of camponotine ant in the family Formicidae.

Subspecies
These five subspecies belong to the species Camponotus sericeiventris:
 Camponotus sericeiventris holmgreni Wheeler, 1931
 Camponotus sericeiventris otoquensis Wheeler, 1931
 Camponotus sericeiventris pontifex Santschi, 1936
 Camponotus sericeiventris rex Forel, 1907
 Camponotus sericeiventris satrapus Wheeler, 1931

References

Further reading

 

sericeiventris
Insects described in 1838